Brigadier General Karel Christopher Ndjoba was a Namibian military officer whose last appointment was as Defence Attaché to Germany. His father Cornelius Tuhafeni Ndjoba was chief minister of Ovamboland.

Career

SWATF career
Ndjoba's military career began in SWATF, the military arm of South Africa's Administration of Namibia in 1978; he served in 101 Battalion. Due to his leadership qualities he was selected for officer training, becoming one of the first black officers in the battalion. He later became a company commander.

NDF career 
Ndjoba joined the Namibian Defence Force as a pioneer, at Independence on 21 March 1990 Ndjoba was part of the first SWATF  and PLAN combined battalion on parade with the new national colors as a company commander deputised by Victor Simunja. General Ndjoba served extensively in the Joint operations directorate of the Namibian Defence force were in 2002 he was promoted to Colonel and appointed as Senior Staff Officer Operations. He also served as a Brigade second in command in DRC during the Second Congo War. He served as a part of directing Staff at the SADC Regional PeaceKeeping Centre in Zimbabwe and was part of the interim  Planning Element for the SADC Standby Force at SADC Secretariat in Botswana.
He was promoted to Brigadier General  in 2009 and appointed as NDF Chief of Staff Personnel at Defence HeadQuarters.  He also served as chairman of the ISDSC Working Group on Human Resources,. He was Then appointed as Defence Attache to Germany in 2014. He died on 16 November 2014

Qualifications
Masters of Arts in Security and Strategic Studies-UNAM
Senior Command and Staff Course-Canadian Land Forces Command and Staff College
Advanced Military Law course
International Collective Training Briefing Course, Britain
Executive Course in Managing Multinational peace Mission at the Witwatersrand University

Honours and decorations
  NDF Commendation Medal
 NDF Commendation Medal(Silver).
  Campaign Medal
  Army Ten Years Service Medal
 SADC Brigade Service Medal

References

Namibian military personnel
1961 births
2014 deaths